Zagra is a commune in Bistrița-Năsăud County, Transylvania, Romania. It is composed of five villages: Alunișul (until 1960 Găureni; Gaurény), Perișor (Bethlenkörtvélyes), Poienile Zagrei (Pojény), Suplai (Ciblesfalva) and Zagra.

Natives
Nicolae Drăganu

References

Communes in Bistrița-Năsăud County
Localities in Transylvania